Gercüş District is a district of Batman Province in Turkey. The town of Gercüş is the seat and the district had a population of 19,304 in 2021. Its area is 914 km2.

Composition
There are two municipalities in Gercüş District:
 Gercüş
 Kayapınar

There are 58 villages in Gercüş District:

 Akburç
 Akyar
 Ardıç
 Ardıçlı
 Arıca
 Aydınca
 Aydınlı
 Babnir
 Bağlıca
 Bağözü
 Başarköy
 Başova
 Becirman
 Boğazköy
 Çalışkan
 Cevizli
 Çiçekli
 Çukuryurt
 Dereiçi
 Dereli
 Doruk
 Düzmeşe
 Eymir
 Geçitköy
 Gökçe
 Gökçepınar
 Gönüllü
 Gürbüz
 Güzelöz
 Hisar
 Kantar
 Karalan
 Kayalar
 Kesiksu
 Kırkat
 Kışlak
 Koçak
 Kömürcü
 Koyunlu
 Kozlu
 Kutlu
 Nurlu
 Özler
 Poyraz
 Rüzgarlı
 Sargın
 Seki
 Serinköy
 Taşçı
 Tepecik
 Ulaş
 Yakıtlı
 Yamanlar
 Yassıca
 Yayladüzü
 Yemişli
 Yenice
 Yüceköy

The district encompasses 12 hamlets.

References 

Districts of Batman Province
Gercüş District